Tomasz Ciesielski (born 2 May 1979 in Inowrocław) is a Polish former footballer who played as a defender.

Career
While playing for Polonia Warsaw early in his career, Cieślewicz won the league and the Polish League Cup with the team in the 1999–00 season. In the next campaign, he helped Polonia win the Polish Cup and Polish Super Cup. On 10 February 2002, he made his debut for the Polish national team in a 2–1 win against Faroe Islands.

Honours
Polonia Warsaw
Ekstraklasa: 1999–00
Polish Cup: 2000–01
Polish League Cup: 1999–00
Polish Super Cup: 2000

References

External links
 

1979 births
Living people
People from Inowrocław
Sportspeople from Kuyavian-Pomeranian Voivodeship
Polish footballers
Poland international footballers
Association football defenders
Unia Janikowo players
Elana Toruń players
Polonia Warsaw players
Widzew Łódź players
Kujawiak Włocławek players
Zawisza Bydgoszcz players
Zagłębie Sosnowiec players
KSZO Ostrowiec Świętokrzyski players
Ząbkovia Ząbki players
Siarka Tarnobrzeg players
Ekstraklasa players
I liga players
II liga players
III liga players